The longtrunk conger (Ariosoma anale), also known as the short-tail conger, is an eel in the family Congridae (conger/garden eels). It was described by Felipe Poey in 1860, originally under the genus Conger. It is a tropical, marine eel which is known from the western and eastern Atlantic Ocean, including southern Florida, Panama, the Guianas, and the Gulf of Guinea. It leads a benthic lifestyle, and inhabits sand and rock at a depth range of 11–63 meters. Males can reach a maximum total length of 36.3 centimeters.

References

Ariosoma
Taxa named by Felipe Poey
Fish described in 1860